Mehrdasht District is a district (bakhsh) in Najafabad County, Isfahan Province, Iran. At the 2006 census, its population was 24,342, in 6,605 families.  The District has two cities: Dehagh and Alavicheh. The District has two rural districts (dehestan): Eshen Rural District and Hoseynabad Rural District.

References 

Najafabad County
Districts of Isfahan Province